Combat Report was a short dramatic propaganda film produced by the U.S. Army Signal Corps in 1942, and shows the anti-submarine efforts of a bombing crew. It was nominated for an Academy Award for Best Documentary Feature in 1942.

See also 
 List of Allied propaganda films of World War II

References

External links 
 
 
 Combat Report at the National Archives and Records Administration

1942 films
1940s war films
American World War II propaganda shorts
American black-and-white films
1940s American films